The 2010 Colombo floods were an isolated incident that took place between 10 November and 11 November 2010 in Colombo, Sri Lanka. A joint Government-UN assessment was launched on the 13th to understand the level of damage in the affected areas.

Damage 
According to the Disaster Management Centre, the heavy rains displaced over 260,000 people in Colombo and suburbs. Heavy rains also submerged the parliament under  of water, and damaged 257 houses, while completely destroying 11. Current death toll stands at 1.

The Ministry of Education have also requested all schools to be closed during the period., while the Ministry of Labour Relations entitled paid-leave for government employees.

Multiple grid substations were also shut down by the Ceylon Electricity Board in various locations in Colombo, due to the risk of being submerged. Leading to power outages in multiple areas.

Relief efforts 
The government deployed Air Force Bell 212 helicopters to assist in aerial assessments and missions to rescue stranded people. 1,800 Sri Lankan Army troops were deployed to relief flood victims on the ground, while the Navy deployed trawlers to provide food and transportation in the affected areas. The DMC also disbursed Rs.20 million (≈180,000 USD) to relief efforts.

The Sri Lanka navy and army also made public appeals asking flood victims to contact them for relief assistance. Television and radio stations repeatedly broadcast their contact numbers.

See also 
 Cyclone Jal
 Geography of Sri Lanka

References

External links 
 The floods that wreaked havoc; aerial photographs by the Sri Lanka Air Force
 Flood in Colombo-Katunayaka road. Come early: Sri Lankan Airlines requests passengers

Floods in Sri Lanka
Colombo Floods, 2010
Colombo Floods, 2010
21st century in Colombo
2010 disasters in Sri Lanka